This article contains information about the literary events and publications of 2014.

Events
January – Parts of two previously unknown poems by the female Greek poet Sappho are discovered on ancient papyrus. This is reported by several news sources by the end of the month.
January 18 – The first books are transferred from the old to the new National Library of Latvia in Riga.
March 6 – Joseph Boyden's novel The Orenda wins the 2014 edition of Canada Reads.
April 24 – Writers including Mark Haddon and Mary Beard join a campaign against a ban on sending books to U.K. prison inmates.
May 22 – J. R. R. Tolkien's 1926 translation of Beowulf is first published. (His essay "On Translating Beowulf" had appeared in 1940).
June 10 – As part of a Northern Iraq offensive, ISIL and aligned Salafi jihadist forces take Mosul, leading to extensive book burning at its libraries, as part of the destruction of cultural heritage by ISIL.
November 25 – Discovery of a previously unknown copy of the First Folio of Shakespeare's plays (1623) in the public library at Saint-Omer in northern France is announced.

Anniversaries
28 January – On this day 75 years ago, W. B. Yeats died in Menton, France.
5 February – William Burroughs was born in 1914 (100th Anniversary)
21 February – Christopher Marlowe's 450th birthday celebrated (may or may not be his birthday)
1 March – On this day 100 years ago, Ralph Ellison (author of Invisible Man) was born.
9 March – Charles Bukowski died 20 years ago today (1994).
10 March – On this day 50 years ago, John Updike receives the National Book Award for The Centaur.
31 March – 100th anniversary of the birth of the Nobel Prize-winning Mexican poet Octavio Paz in 1914.
4 April – Marguerite Duras was born in 1914 (100th Anniversary)
14 April – On this day 75 years ago, The Grapes of Wrath by John Steinbeck was published.
16 April – Ralph Ellison dies on this date 20 years ago in 1994. (see March 1 above for Ellison links)
18 April – On this day 40 years ago (1974) the first printing of J. M. Coetzee's debut novel Dusklands appeared in hardback.
23 April – It is assumed that William Shakespeare was born on this day 450 years ago (because records show that he was baptised on 26 April).
26 April – The centenary of Bernard Malamud's birth (April 26, 1914).
May – The 100th anniversary of Gertrude Stein's Tender Buttons.
16 June – This year's Bloomsday celebration will also mark the 100th anniversary of the publication (June 1914) of Joyce's Dubliners.
21 September – the 50th anniversary of the publication of Herzog by Saul Bellow, the second of his three National Book Award-winning novels.
7 July – Sir Walter Scott's debut novel, Waverley, was published (anonymously) 200 years ago today.
22 September – Alain-Fournier died in action in northern France 100 years ago today, just a year after the publication of his only novel, Le Grand Meaulnes.
27 October – Dylan Thomas was born a hundred years ago.
18 November – Margaret Atwood celebrates her 75th birthday today.
2 December – The Marquis de Sade died 200 years ago today.

New books

Fiction
Dates after each title indicate U.S. publication, unless stated otherwise.
Belinda Alexandra – Sapphire Skies (Australia)
Jacob M. Appel – Scouting for the Reaper (February 15)
Kate Atkinson – A God in Ruins (UK)
Margaret Atwood – Stone Mattress – Nine Tales (September 16)
Bandi – The Accusation (Korean language short stories, South Korea, May)
Natalie Baszile – Queen Sugar (February 6)
Pierce Brown – Red Rising (January 28)
Jessie Burton – The Miniaturist (UK)
Anthony Doerr – All the Light We Cannot See (May 6)
Ceridwen Dovey – Only the Animals (April 23)
David Grossman – A Horse Walks into a Bar: A novel (In original Hebrew as סוס אחד נכנס לְבָּר (Soos Echad Nechnas L'bar), Israel)
John Hornor Jacobs – The Incorruptibles (UK)
Marlon James – A Brief History of Seven Killings (October 2)
Stephen King
Mr. Mercedes (June 3)
Revival (November 11)
Thomas King – The Back of the Turtle
Paul Kingsnorth – The Wake (UK, April?)
Herman Koch – Geachte heer M. (Dear Mr. M., Netherlands)
Niviaq Korneliussen – Homo Sapienne (Greenland)
Laila Lalami – The Moor's Account (September 9)
S. E. Lister – Hideous Creatures (UK, May)
Édouard Louis (born Eddy Bellegueule) – En finir avec Eddy Bellegueule (translated as The End of Eddy, France, February)
Jennifer Nansubuga Makumbi – Kintu (Ugandan-born author published in Kenya)
Emily St. John Mandel – Station Eleven (Canada)
Javier Marías – Así empieza lo malo (Thus Bad Begins, Spain)
Sean Michaels – Us Conductors (Canada, April 8)
Karen Miller – The Falcon Throne (September)
Haruki Murakami – Colorless Tsukuru Tazaki and His Years of Pilgrimage (translation, August 12)
Rick Riordan – The Blood of Olympus (October 7)
Rudy Ruiz – Seven for the Revolution
Samanta Schweblin – Distancia de rescate (translated as Fever Dream, Argentina)
Roger Scruton – Notes from Underground (March 12)
Akhil Sharma – Family Life
Joss Sheldon – Involution & Evolution (August 4)
Leïla Slimani – Dans le jardin de l'ogre (France)
Ali Smith – How to Be Both (UK, August 28)
Miriam Toews – All My Puny Sorrows
Olga Tokarczuk – The Books of Jacob (Księgi Jakubowe) (Poland, October)
Niall Williams – History of the Rain

Children and young people
Chris Van Allsburg – The Misadventures of Sweetie Pie
David Almond
A Song for Ella Grey
The Tightrope Walkers
Connah Brecon – There's This Thing
A. F. Harrold – The Imaginary
John Hornor Jacobs – The Shibboleth
J. Patrick Lewis (with Gary Kelley) – Harlem Hellfighters
Katherine Rundell – Rooftoppers
Jon Scieszka – Frank Einstein and the Antimatter Motor (first in the Frank Einstein series of four books)
R. A. Spratt – Friday Barnes
Maggie Stiefvater – Blue Lily, Lily Blue (third book in The Raven Cycle, October 21)
Zoe Sugg – Girl Online (UK, November 25)

Drama
Mike Bartlett – King Charles III
John Patrick Shanley – Outside Mullingar

Poetry

Rosemary Tonks (posthumous) – Bedouin of the London Evening (selected poetry and prose)

Non-fiction
Alan Cumming – Not My Father's Son
Lindsay David – Australia: Boom to Bust
Mark Felton – Zero Night
William H. Frey – Diversity Explosion
Michael Gross – House of Outrageous Fortune'

Christophe Guilluy – La France périphériqueMadhu Kishwar – Modi, Muslims and Media: Voices from Narendra Modi's GujaratNaomi Klein – This Changes Everything: Capitalism vs. the ClimatePhilip Lymbery and Isabel Oakeshott – FarmageddonHelen Macdonald – H is for Hawk (UK, July)
Rajiv Malhotra – Indra's NetLucy Mangan – Inside Charlie's Chocolate FactoryL. A. Paul – Transformative ExperienceWinifred Phillips – A Composer's Guide to Game MusicClaudia Rankine – Citizen: An American LyricRoger ScrutonHow to Be a Conservative (UK, September 11)The Soul of the WorldDouglas Vakoch – Archaeology, Anthropology, and Interstellar CommunicationErik Voskuil – Before MarioDeaths
Birth years link to the corresponding "[year] in literature" article,
January 4 – Jean Metellus, Haitian neurologist, author, poet, and playwright (born 1937) 
January 14 – Juan Gelman, Argentine poet, 83 (born 1930)
January 28 – Nigel Jenkins, Welsh poet, journalist, and geographer, 64 (born 1949)
January 29 – Hashem Shabani, Iranian poet, 32, (hanged, born c. 1982)
February 18 – Mavis Gallant, Canadian writer of short stories, 91 (born 1923)
March 2 – Justin Kaplan, American writer, editor and biographer, 88 (born 1925)
March 18 – Catherine Obianuju Acholonu, Nigerian researcher and poet, 
April 2
Glyn Jones, South African actor and screenwriter (born 1931)
Urs Widmer, Swiss author and playwright (born 1938)
April 5 – Peter Matthiessen, American novelist, naturalist and wilderness writer, 86 (born 1927)
April 10
Doris Pilkington Garimara (Nugi Garimara), Aboriginal novelist, 77 (born 1937)
Sue Townsend, English comic novelist and playwright, 68 (born 1946)
April 15 – Rosemary Tonks, English poet, prose writer, and children's writer (born 1928)
April 17 – Gabriel García Márquez, Colombian Nobel laureate, 87 (born 1927)
April 20 – Alistair MacLeod, Canadian writer, 77 (born 1936)
April 24 – Tadeusz Różewicz, Polish poet, dramatist and writer, 92 (born 1921)
May 6 – Farley Mowat, Canadian author and environmentalist, 92 (born 1921)
May 21 – Ruth Guimarães, Afro-Brazilian classicist, fiction writer and poet, 93 (born 1920)
May 28
Maya Angelou, American author, poet and civil rights activist, 86 (born 1928)
Oscar Dystel, American paperback publisher, 101 (born 1912).
June 19 – Josephine Pullein-Thompson, English children's novelist, 90 (born 1924)
June 22 – Felix Dennis, English publisher and poet, 67 (born 1947)
June 23 – Nancy Garden, American author (born 1938)
June 25 – Ana María Matute, Spanish writer, 88 (born 1925)
June 29 – Dermot Healy, Irish poet, playwright, fiction writer and memoirist. 66 (born 1947)
July 4 – C. J. Henderson, American author and critic, 62
July 7 – Sheila K. McCullagh, English children's writer (born 1920)
July 13 – Nadine Gordimer, South African writer, anti-apartheid activist, and Nobel Peace Prize laureate, 90 (born 1923)
July 20 – Thomas Berger, American writer, 93 (born 1924)
August 1 – Jan Roar Leikvoll, Norwegian novelist, 40 (brain tumour, born 1974)
August 2
Billie Letts, American novelist, 73 (born 1938)
James Thompson, American-Finnish author, 49 (born 1964)
September 4
Orunamamu, American-Canadian author, story-teller and educator, 93 (born 1921)
Edgar Steele, American lawyer and author, 69 (born 1945)
September 21 – Linda Griffiths, Canadian playwright, 60 (born 1953)
September 24 – Hugh C. Rae (Jessica Stirling, etc.), Scottish novelist, 79 (born 1935)
September 28 – Dannie Abse, Welsh poet and physician, 91 (born 1923)
November 27 – P. D. James, English crime writer, 94 (born 1920)
November 29 – Mark Strand, Canadian-born American poet and writer, United States Poet Laureate, 80 (born 1934)
November 30
Radwa Ashour, Egyptian writer and academic, 68 (born 1946)
Kent Haruf, American novelist, 71 (born 1943)
December 3 – Vicente Leñero, Mexican writer and journalist, 81 (born 1933)
December 12 – Norman Bridwell, American author and illustrator, 86 (born 1928)
December 24 – Lee Israel, American biographer and literary forger, 75 (born 1939)

Awards
Anisfield-Wolf Book Award: A Constellation of Vital Phenomena by Anthony Marra
Baileys Women's Prize for Fiction: A Girl Is a Half-formed Thing by Eimear McBride
Caine Prize for African Writing: Okwiri Oduor, "My Father's Head"
Camões Prize: Alberto da Costa e Silva
Costa Book of the Year: H is for Hawk by Helen Macdonald
Danuta Gleed Literary Award: Paul Carlucci, The Secret Life of FissionDayne Ogilvie Prize: Tamai Kobayashi
Desmond Elliott Prize: A Girl Is a Half-formed Thing by Eimear McBride
DSC Prize for South Asian Literature: Chronicle of a Corpse Bearer by Cyrus Mistry
Dylan Thomas Prize: To Rise Again at a Decent Hour by Joshua Ferris
European Book Prize: Pascale Hugues, Hannah's Dress, and Anthony Giddens, Turbulent and Mighty ContinentFolio Prize: Tenth of December: Stories by George Saunders
German Book Prize: Kruso by Lutz Seiler
Goldsmiths Prize: How to Be Both by Ali Smith
Gordon Burn Prize: The Wake by Paul Kingsnorth
Governor General's Award for English-language fiction: Thomas King, The Back of the TurtleGovernor General's Award for French-language fiction: Andrée A. Michaud, BondréeGovernor General's Awards, other categories: See 2014 Governor General's Awards.
Grand Prix du roman de l'Académie française: Adrien Bosc, for ConstellationInternational Prize for Arabic Fiction: Frankenstein in Baghdad by Ahmed Saadawi
International Dublin Literary Award: Juan Gabriel Vásquez, The Sound of Things FallingKerry Group Irish Fiction Award: A Girl Is a Half-formed Thing by Eimear McBride
Lambda Literary Awards: Multiple categories; see 26th Lambda Literary Awards
Lannan Lifetime Achievement Award: Steve Erickson
Man Booker Prize: The Narrow Road to the Deep North by Richard Flanagan
Miles Franklin Award: All The Birds, Singing by Evie Wyld
National Biography Award: The Ambitions of Jane Franklin: Victorian Lady Adventurer by Alison Alexander
National Book Award for Fiction: to Redeployment by Phil Klay
Nobel Prize in Literature: to Patrick Modiano
PEN/Faulkner Award for Fiction: We Are All Completely Beside Ourselves by Karen Joy Fowler
Pulitzer Prize for Fiction: The Goldfinch by Donna Tartt
Pulitzer Prize for Poetry: 3 Sections by Vijay Seshadri
Rogers Writers' Trust Fiction Prize: Miriam Toews, All My Puny SorrowsSAARC Literary Award: Tarannum Riyaz
Samuel Johnson Prize: H is for Hawk by Helen Macdonald
Scotiabank Giller Prize: Sean Michaels, Us ConductorsGolden Wreath of Struga Poetry Evenings: Ko Un
Walter Scott Prize: An Officer and a Spy'' by Robert Harris
Zbigniew Herbert International Literary Award: Charles Simic

See also

References

External links

Most popular 2014 book articles viewed on Wikipedia, with user comments on traffic jumps – The latest statistics can be found on Wikitop

 
Years of the 21st century in literature